The National Federation of Perspectives and Realities Clubs (Fédération Nationale des Clubs Perspectives et Réalités, CPR) was a centrist political movement in France.

It was founded in May 1965 by Jean-Pierre Fourcade and was a founding component of the Union for French Democracy in 1978.

In July 1995 the Clubs were replaced by the Popular Party for French Democracy.

Political parties established in 1965
Political parties of the French Fifth Republic
Union for French Democracy